William James Webbe (or Webb) (born July 13, 1830 in Redruth, Cornwall, England – died 1904 in England) was an early English Pre-Raphaelite painter and illustrator, known for his rustic, religious, and book paintings.

Life 
Webbe was born on 13 July 1830 at Redruth, Cornwall, and baptized on the 23rd of that month at St Austell, Cornwall. He was one of eight children of Wesleyan Church minister Rev. Samuel Webb and Sarah née Stirrup. He married Besse before 1871, the couple had two children, Wilfred Mark Webb and Ethel Alice Webb, and lived in London. He travelled abroad, to Dusseldorf, where he study art, where he was probably influenced by Nazarenes art. Webbe returned to England in 1853, and made his debut at the Royal Academy. He took part in exhibitions at the Royal Academy, the British Institution, and the Royal Society of British Artists from 1853 to 1878.

Webbe was an early convert to Pre-Raphaelitism. Allen Staley wrote about Webbe in his book The Pre-Raphaelite Landscape (1973), and noted that two of his works dating from 1854–55 are of "Pre-Raphaelite elaboration of microscopic foreground detail pushed to an almost insane extreme". In 1862 Webbe pilgrimaged to Jerusalem and the Middle East and began to paint Eastern subjects. Webbe's journey was probably inspired by English painter and one of the founders of the Pre-Raphaelite Brotherhood William Holman Hunt, who visited the Holy Land in 1854–1856, 1869–1872, 1875–1878, and 1892.

Webbe is known for his book illustrations for six volumes published by the London publishing house Raphael Tuck & Sons. More of his illustrations can be found in Biblical Stories for Children and in books by authors such as William Makepeace Thackeray and those of his son Wilfred Mark Webb. He drew his book illustrations using the pseudonym WJ Webb.

William James Webbe was living in the Isle of Wight in 1856, later, in 1861, he resided at Langham Chambers, "in an area where many of the Pre-Raphaelites congregated and had their studios". According to Webbe's great great grandniece, Jennie Shelley, "In the 1901 census William aged 70 and his wife Besse aged 52 were living at 4 Marlborough Rd, Ealing, Middlesex, and his occupation was artist. Also at that address was his daughter Ethel who was a science mistress." His brothers, Samuel Webb and Thomas Stirrup Webb, emigrated to New Zealand. Samuel was a pottery manufacturer in Stoke on Trent, William's mother, Sarah Stirrup, also "came from generations of pottery manufacturers".

Reception 

John Ruskin briefly commented on The White Owl, exhibited at the Royal Academy in 1856, in his Academy Notes: "A careful study — the brown wing excellent. The softness of an owl's feathers is perhaps inimitable; but I think the breast might have come nearer the mark."

There are two versions of The White Owl painting; one was sold at Sotheby's Belgravia on 14 June 1977 (lot 31) and bought by the Fine Art Society, the second one is owned by Christie's, and previously was in the collection of William John Broderip (1789-1859), a lawyer and naturalist who helped to found the Zoological Society of London.

Webbe's work A street in Jerusalem (1867) received mixed reviews. His contemporary art critic Tom Taylor of the Times wrote: "[the painting] is treated in the most realistic spirit ...but the composition seems to us too crowded for the canvas, and there is an abuse of bright colour...it may be that the critic in this cold, grey north is not competent to pass judgement on eastern colour ...for Mr Webbe's clever and careful Street in Jerusalem".

Works 

 A Hedge Bank in May, 1855
 Twilight, c. 1855 
 Cattle and a Fram, 1856
 The White Owl, 1856
 Strawberries, 1860
 Lambs, 1860
 The Collared Thief, 1860
 Early Lambs, 1861
 A Rabbit, 1862
 Street in Jerusalem, 1863
 Ploughing on Mount Zion, 1864
 The Lost Sheep, 1864
 A White Terrier by a Mossy Bank with Flowers, 1871
 A Plough Team outside Jerusalem, 1879
 Perch on a River Bank

Book illustrations 

6 books printed by Raphael Tuck and Sons:
The 23rd Psalm
The Influence Of Beauty by Keats
Feld Blumen (poetry in German)
Bluen Botschaft (poetry in German)
Homes Of England by Felicia Hemans
The Sower And The Seed by Helen Marion Burnside
Other books for adults:
The Holiday Train by Frederick Longbridge
 The History of Samuel Titmarsh and the Great Hoggarty Diamond. A Little Dinner at Timmins's and Notes of a Journey from Cornhill to Grand Cairo by William Makepeace Thackeray, Smith, Elder & Co., London, 1879
The Childrens Friend, 1893
Eton Nature-Study And Observational Lessons (2 volumes) by M.D. Hill and Wilfred Mark Webb
 The Heritage of Dress. Being Notes on the History and Evolution of Clothes by Wilfred Mark Webb, The Times Book Club, London, 1912
 Illustrated Natural History by W. G. Ridewood, Richard Tuck, London,  1902
The Friendly Visitor
Bible stories for children:
Bible Stories And Pictures by James Weston
Bible Pictures And Stories (New Testament) by James Weston
Bible Pictures And Stories (Old and New Testament)
The Beautiful Story
Charming Bible Stories
Young Folks Story Of The Bible
Old Testament Stories by Robert Tuck

Notes

References

External links 

1830 births
1904 deaths
19th-century English painters
English male painters
Pre-Raphaelite painters
Pre-Raphaelite illustrators
19th-century English male artists